Austin Claude Taylor (June 20, 1893 – January 17, 1965) was a farmer, merchant and political figure in New Brunswick. Born in Salisbury, New Brunswick, he represented Westmorland County in the Legislative Assembly of New Brunswick from 1935 to 1957.

Appointed to the Executive Council as the Minister of Agriculture, he served under two Premiers from 1935 to 1952.

Austin Taylor was the leader of the Liberal Party of New Brunswick from 1954 to 1956.

On January 3, 1957 Taylor was appointed to the Senate of Canada by Canadian Prime Minister Louis St. Laurent as the representative for Westmorland, New Brunswick. He served in the Senate until his death in 1965.

References 
 
 Government of New Brunswick, Department of Agriculture (PDF file)

1893 births
1965 deaths
Canadian farmers
20th-century Canadian businesspeople
New Brunswick Liberal Association MLAs
Members of the Executive Council of New Brunswick
Liberal Party of Canada senators
Canadian senators from New Brunswick
People from Westmorland County, New Brunswick
New Brunswick Liberal Association leaders